Superior is a city in Dickinson County, Iowa, United States. The population was 132 at the time of the 2020 census.

History
Superior began its historic existence in 1882 when the railroad was built through the neighborhood.

Geography
Superior is located at  (43.432156, -94.945692).

Demographics

2010 census
As of the census of 2010, there were 130 people, 52 households, and 34 families living in the city. The racial makeup of the city was 99.2% White and 0.8% from two or more races. Hispanic or Latino of any race were 1.5% of the population.

There were 52 households, of which 26.9% had children under the age of 18 living with them, 50.0% were married couples living together, 7.7% had a female householder with no husband present, 7.7% had a male householder with no wife present, and 34.6% were non-families. 28.8% of all households were made up of individuals, and 9.6% had someone living alone who was 65 years of age or older. The average household size was 2.50 and the average family size was 2.97.

The median age in the city was 44.5 years. 22.3% of residents were under the age of 18; 6.9% were between the ages of 18 and 24; 21.5% were from 25 to 44; 33.1% were from 45 to 64; and 16.2% were 65 years of age or older. The gender makeup of the city was 53.1% male and 46.9% female.

2000 census
As of the census of 2000, there were 142 people, 57 households, and 40 families living in the city. The racial makeup of the city was 99.30% White and 0.70% Asian. Hispanic or Latino of any race were 2.11% of the population.

There were 57 households, out of which 28.1% had children under the age of 18 living with them, 61.4% were married couples living together, 3.5% had a female householder with no husband present, and 29.8% were non-families. 24.6% of all households were made up of individuals, and 15.8% had someone living alone who was 65 years of age or older. The average household size was 2.49 and the average family size was 3.03.

In the city, the population was spread out, with 26.1% under the age of 18, 7.0% from 18 to 24, 26.1% from 25 to 44, 26.8% from 45 to 64, and 14.1% who were 65 years of age or older. The median age was 40 years. For every 100 females, there were 118.5 males. For every 100 females age 18 and over, there were 105.9 males.

The median income for a household in the city was $35,000, and the median income for a family was $39,250. Males had a median income of $28,333 versus $21,250 for females. The per capita income for the city was $25,486. There were none of the families and 3.3% of the population living below the poverty line, including no under eighteens and none of those over 64.

Education
Estherville–Lincoln Central Community School District operates area public schools. It was established on July 1, 1997, by the merger of the Estherville and Lincoln Central school districts. The northwest portion of town is served by Spirit Lake Community School District.

References

External links

Cities in Dickinson County, Iowa
Cities in Iowa